Mario's Game Gallery (later re-released as Mario's FUNdamentals) is an American compilation of games published by Interplay Productions and developed by Presage Software, Inc. for DOS, Windows and Macintosh. It was released in 1995 in the United States. It was later re-released as Mario's FUNdamentals for Macintosh in 1996, and for Windows in January 1997, though it was published by Mindscape for the DOS and Windows versions and by Stepping Stone for the Macintosh version. It was also developed by Brainstorm Entertainment.

The game includes five traditional games: checkers, backgammon, Go Fish, dominoes, and "yacht", a version of Yahtzee. Players play against Mario in these games, which play similarly to their real world counterparts, though with themes based on the Mario universe.

Since their releases, both versions have received mixed reception; while publications such as The State and the Los Angeles Times found the game to be a good educational game, authors David Wesley and Gloria Barczak blamed it in part for almost destroying the Mario brand. Official Nintendo Magazine listed it as one of the rarest Mario games as well.

Gameplay

Mario's Game Gallery consists of five games: checkers, Go Fish, dominoes, backgammon, and "yacht", a version of Yahtzee. In these games, players face off against Mario. The games all play similarly to their real world counterparts, featuring pieces based on the Mario universe. Mario's Game Gallery is the first game in the series to feature Charles Martinet as Mario's voice actor; Martinet has since voiced Mario in all speaking appearances in video games.

Development
Mario's Game Gallery was published by Interplay Entertainment Corp. and developed by Presage Software, Inc. for the PC. It was released in 1995. It was later re-released as Mario's FUNdamentals, though it was published by Mindscape for the PC version and by Stepping Stone for the Macintosh version. It was also developed by Brainstorm Entertainment. It was released for the Macintosh in 1996, and for the PC in January 1997.

Reception
Since their releases, both Mario's Game Gallery and its reversion Mario's FUNdamentals have received mixed reception. The State praised it for "providing fun for whole family," describing the games included as "excellent." The Miami Herald praised its "sharp" graphics and "fun" animations, as well as the music, which they claim to be based on music from the Mario series. Like The State, they describe it as "fun for the whole family," though they criticize it for being too difficult at times. However, they recommend it for first-time PC users who want an "easy-to-install product for the new CD-ROM." The Advocate called it a fun game, and praised Martinet for his Mario voice, stating that small children will "giggle with delight." The Los Angeles Times included it in an article of educational video games that would appeal to younger gamers.

Authors David Wesley and Gloria Barczak cited Mario's Game Gallery as one of the games released in a "flood of ill-conceived Mario spin-offs", stating that it and the others nearly destroyed the series. Official Nintendo Magazines Tom East featured it as part of his "Rare Mario games" article, commenting that though it featured Martinet as Mario first, most identify Super Mario 64 as his first role as Mario. It was deemed the sixth-worst Mario game of all time by ScrewAttack, concluding that there was "nothing fun about FUNdamentals".

References

External links

1995 video games
Classic Mac OS games
Digital board games
Digital card games
DOS games
English-language-only video games
Interplay Entertainment games
Mario educational games
Mindscape games
North America-exclusive video games
Presage Software games
Single-player video games
Tile-based video games
Video games developed in the United States
Windows games